Liu Renwang (born 22 July 1986 in Beijing), is a male Chinese judoka who competed at the 2008 Summer Olympics in the Extra lightweight (under 60 kg) event.

Major performances
2005 National Games - 1st 60 kg class;
2007 National Champions Tournament - 1st 60 kg class;
2007 Japan Jigoro Kano Cup - 3rd 60 kg class

See also
China at the 2008 Summer Olympics

References

External links
 
 
 
 http://2008teamchina.olympic.cn/index.php/personview/personsen/2770

1986 births
Living people
Chinese male judoka
Judoka at the 2008 Summer Olympics
Olympic judoka of China
Sportspeople from Beijing
20th-century Chinese people
21st-century Chinese people